Declan Rice (born 14 January 1999) is an English professional footballer who plays as a defensive midfielder for  club West Ham United and the England national team.

Born in England, Rice has paternal Irish grandparents and previously represented the Republic of Ireland internationally at both youth and senior levels, before switching his allegiance to England in 2019.

Club career

Youth
Rice was born and raised in Kingston upon Thames, Greater London. His paternal grandparents were from Douglas, County Cork, in Ireland. He grew up in Kingston upon Thames and joined the academy of Chelsea in 2006, as a seven-year-old. In 2014, after his release at the age of 14, he joined the academy of West Ham United. West Ham United Academy coach Trevor Bumstead stated it was Rice's determination and persistence that helped him break through the ranks at West Ham.

West Ham United

On 16 December 2015, just over a year after joining West Ham United at youth level, Rice signed his first professional contract with the club. Rice received his first call-up to the West Ham senior squad for the games against Sunderland and Everton in April 2017, after impressing in the under-23 team. He made his senior debut against Burnley on the last day of the 2016–17 Premier League season, coming on as a 91st-minute substitute for Edimilson Fernandes in a 2–1 away win, five days after captaining the under-23's to promotion with a 2–1 win at Newcastle United. His full senior debut came on 19 August 2017 in a 3–2 defeat at Southampton.

In April 2018, Rice was named as runner-up for the 2017–18 Hammer of the Year award behind Marko Arnautović. On 22 December, he made his 50th appearance for West Ham, the first player to do so while still a teenager since Michael Carrick. On 28 December 2018, Rice signed a new contract until 2024 with the option of an additional year. On 12 January 2019, Rice scored his first goal for West Ham and was named man of the match in a 1–0 win against Arsenal, in West Ham's 50th Premier League game at the London Stadium. On 20 April 2019, Rice was named on the shortlist for the PFA Young Player of the Year award, which was eventually awarded to Rice's England teammate Raheem Sterling. At the end of the 2018–19 season, he was named the Players' Player of the Year and won the award for Individual Performance of the Season, for his match winning game against Arsenal, and was named the Young Hammer of the Year for the third consecutive season. On 28 December 2019, Rice captained West Ham for the first time, at the age of 20, in a 2–1 home loss against Leicester City.

On 17 July 2020, Rice scored his first and only Premier League goal of the season, an outside-the-box strike against Watford, in a 3–1 win. In the 2019–20 season, Rice played in all 38 league games for West Ham, playing every single minute. He was in the Premier League's top five players for both tackles and interceptions leading West Ham players in both categories and making more passes than any other West Ham player. He was named Hammer of the Year.

On 15 February 2021, Rice scored his first goal of the season when he converted the penalty and put the team in the lead against Sheffield United in a home league win that ended 3–0. In April 2021, having played in all of West Ham's games in the 2020–21 season, Rice was ruled out for four weeks with a knee injury picked-up on international duty with England.

On 16 September 2021, Rice made his European debut and scored his debut European goal in a 2–0 away victory over Dinamo Zagreb in the Europa League. On 9 May 2022, Rice was named as Hammer of the Year for a second time. Following West Ham's Europa League campaign, which saw them reach the semi-final, Rice was named in the 2021–22 UEFA Europa League Team of the Year alongside teammate Craig Dawson. Following the retirement of Mark Noble in May 2022, Rice was named as captain of West Ham.

International career

Republic of Ireland
Although born in London,  Rice was eligible to play for Ireland as his grandparents are from Cork. On 19 March 2017, Rice was named Republic of Ireland U17 player of the year. On 23 May 2017, only days after his Premier League debut, Rice was named in the Republic of Ireland squad to play friendlies against Mexico and Uruguay and a World Cup qualifier at home to Austria. He made his senior debut on 23 March 2018 in a 1–0 defeat to Turkey.

In August 2018, Rice was omitted from the squad to play Wales by manager Martin O'Neill, who said that Rice was considering switching to play for England after being approached by them. By November 2018, having been omitted from three squads selected by O'Neill, Rice said he was no closer in deciding whether to play for Ireland or England. In December 2018, Rice met with new Ireland manager Mick McCarthy and his assistant, Robbie Keane. McCarthy said that Rice was a potential future captain of Ireland and that he would build the team around Rice should he decide to play for the country.

England

On 13 February 2019, Rice pledged his future to England. On 5 March, his change of allegiance was confirmed by FIFA. On 13 March, he was called up by England for their forthcoming UEFA Euro 2020 qualification matches against the Czech Republic and Montenegro. He made his debut on 22 March as a 63rd-minute substitute against the Czech Republic at Wembley Stadium.

On 25 March 2019, England manager Gareth Southgate handed Rice his first start for the national side during a 5–1 victory over Montenegro. Following Rice's successful season, he was handed a place in the England squad for the 2019 UEFA Nations League Finals. In September 2019, Rice said that he had received online death threats after switching allegiance from Ireland to England. He was the first player to play for both countries since Jack Reynolds in the 1890s. Rice was named in the England squad for UEFA Euro 2020. Rice played in all seven games for England at Euro 2020 where they finished runner-up in the final to Italy.

Rice was included in the England squad for the 2022 FIFA World Cup.

Personal life
Rice has been best friends with fellow England international Mason Mount since childhood.

Career statistics

Club

International

England score listed first, score column indicates score after each Rice goal

Honours
England
UEFA European Championship runner-up: 2020
UEFA Nations League third place: 2018–19

Individual
West Ham United Young Player of the Year: 2016–17, 2017–18
West Ham United Player of the Year: 2019–20, 2021–22
Republic of Ireland U17 Player of the Year: 2016
FAI Young International Player of the Year: 2018
UEFA Europa League Team of the Season: 2021–22

See also
 List of association footballers who have been capped for two senior national teams
 List of Republic of Ireland international footballers born outside the Republic of Ireland

References

External links

Profile at the West Ham United F.C. website
Profile at the Football Association website

1999 births
Living people
Footballers from Kingston upon Thames
English footballers
Republic of Ireland association footballers
Association football defenders
Association football midfielders
Chelsea F.C. players
West Ham United F.C. players
Premier League players
Republic of Ireland youth international footballers
Republic of Ireland under-21 international footballers
Republic of Ireland international footballers
England international footballers
UEFA Euro 2020 players
2022 FIFA World Cup players
Dual internationalists (football)
English people of Irish descent